Mireasă pentru fiul meu 3  is the third season of the Romanian Antena 1 competitive reality matrimonial show, which premiered on August 31, 2013. In the Launch Day 15 girls, 11 boys and 5 mothers entered the competition, featuring a total of 31 contestants, the largest amount for any season at the time.

The premise of the series remained largely unchanged from previous editions of the series, in which a group of contestants compete to win the big prize and to marry . In every week one girl and one mother who received the most public votes are declared the weekly girl winner and the weekly mother winner. They can be saved from elimination. Also the weekly mother can save his son from elimination.  A Contestant can be expelled from the show for breaking rules, such as discussing nominations when not permitted.

Contestants 
On Day 1, thirty-one contestants entered the Mireasă pentru fiul meu house. Notable new contestants this season include the Dansez pentru tine star Grigore Moldovan and Raymond Untu who is the brother of former contestant of season 2 Vanessa Untu.

Boys & Girls

Mothers

Season summary
In the first part of Day 1, Traian, Alin, George, Laurențiu and Gabriel entered in competition with their mothers, Mrs. Iuliana, Mrs. Daniela, Mrs. Virginia, Mrs. Maria respectively Mrs. Elena, while Raymond, Gabi, Robert, Andrei, Sorin and Grigore entered in competition without their mothers. In the second part of Day 1 fifteen girls entered in the competition. Andreea entered in house with her dog "Tița". As in any season boys and girls will stay in different houses and they not seen in the first week. In girls house Gina said that she don't had a boyfriend. On Day 4 for the first time in this season all girls were in boys house, while boys were in girls house. After visit Mrs. Daniela upset Mariana, Constantina, Iuia, Claudia, Diana, Ioana and Oana because they told that they want to meet with Traian. On Day 5 Mrs. Elena was unhappy with her standing in the competition and due to conflict with Mrs. Maria, Elena considered quitting. Later, Elena decided to remain for her son. On Day 6 boys cooked cakes for girls. On Day 6 Andreea's dog returned home. The end of the day contestants had a blind date, one boy met each girls and they talked but they don't saw. Boys chose two girls and girls choose two boys, if a boy chooses a girl and that girl chooses that boy, they go on a date. After blind date Traian and Corina, Sorin and Ioana, George and Edit, Robert with Ramona and Diana go on a dates. Andrei is only boy who was not chosen by girls because of his jokes.  After date George told Edit that he loved her.

On Day 7 Corina won the public votes and she became Weekly bride. Constantina was runner-up followed by Marianita in third place. Also Mrs. Iuliana won the public votes and she became Weekly mother. On Day 8 Corina, Constantina and Marianita were in boys house and Traian was in girls house because he was the son of Weekly mother. After visti Traian said that Corina is his favourite girl. Following these events, Andrei and Laurențiu formed the first alliance of the season. In girls house Claudia, Andreea, Diana and Cristina formed the second alliance of the season. On Day 10 Mrs. Virginia accused Mrs. Iuliana as she manipulated all girls. Virginia said that Iuliana praised very much her son. Iuliana denied immediately. On Day 14 Constantina said that Traian is her favourite boy.

Top contestants per week 

On Week 2 Mrs. Iuliana was Weekly mother (60.6%). Corina was Weekly bride (26.5%), Constantina was runner-up (20.5%) and Marianita was in third place (12%).

Voting table
A record of the votes cast, stored in a voting-table, shows how each contestant voted to eliminations throughout his or her time in the house.

Notes
 : There were no nominations in Week 2, Week 3 and Week 4.

Reception

Ratings
The series premiered on August 31, 2013 to a 5.0 rating .

Viewing figures

External links
http://www.mireasapentrufiulmeu.a1.ro/ 
http://www.voteazamireasapentrufiulmeu.ro/
http://mireasapentrufiulmeu.ro/yarismacilar.asp

References

2013 Romanian television seasons
2014 Romanian television seasons